Euchromius gozmanyi is a species of moth in the family Crambidae described by Stanisław Błeszyński in 1961. It is found in France, Spain, Portugal, on Sardinia and Sicily and in Tunisia, Algeria and Morocco.

The wingspan is 15–16 mm.

References

Moths described in 1961
Crambinae
Moths of Europe
Moths of Africa